Realpolitik refers to enacting or engaging in diplomatic or political policies based primarily on considerations of given circumstances and factors, rather than strictly binding itself to explicit ideological notions or moral and ethical premises. In this respect, it shares aspects of its philosophical approach with those of realism and pragmatism. It is often simply referred to as pragmatism in politics, e.g. "pursuing pragmatic policies" or "realistic policies".

While often used as a positive and neutral term, the term Realpolitik is sometimes also used pejoratively to imply political policies that are perceived as being coercive, amoral, or Machiavellian. Prominent proponents of Realpolitik during the 20th century include Henry Kissinger, George F. Kennan, Zbigniew Brzezinski, and Hans-Dietrich Genscher, as well as politicians such as Charles De Gaulle and Lee Kuan Yew.

Etymology 
The term Realpolitik was coined by Ludwig von Rochau, a German writer and politician in the 19th century. His 1853 book Grundsätze der Realpolitik angewendet auf die staatlichen Zustände Deutschlands ("Principles of Realpolitik applied to the national state of affairs of Germany") describes the meaning of the term: 

Historian John Bew suggests that much of what stands for modern Realpolitik today deviates from the original meaning of the term. Realpolitik emerged in mid-19th century Europe from the collision of the Enlightenment with state formation and power politics. The concept, Bew argues, was an early attempt at answering the conundrum of how to achieve liberal enlightened goals in a world that does not follow liberal enlightened rules.

Publicist, journalist and liberal political reformer Von Rochau coined the term in 1853 and added a second volume in 1869 that further refined his earlier arguments. Rochau, exiled in Paris until the 1848 uprising, returned during the revolution and became a well-known figure in the National Liberal Party. As the liberal gains of the 1848 revolutions fell victim to coercive governments or were swallowed by powerful social forces such as class, religion and nationalism, Rochau—according to Bew—began to think hard about how the work that had begun with such enthusiasm had failed to yield any lasting results.

He said that the great achievement of the Enlightenment had been to show that might is not necessarily right. The mistake liberals made was to assume that the law of the strong had suddenly evaporated simply because it had been shown to be unjust. Rochau wrote that "to bring down the walls of Jericho, the Realpolitiker knows the simple pickaxe is more useful than the mightiest trumpet". Rochau's concept was seized upon by German thinkers in the mid and late 19th century and became associated with Otto von Bismarck's statecraft in unifying Germany in the mid 19th century. By 1890, usage of the word Realpolitik was widespread, yet increasingly detached from its original meaning.

Political realism in international relations 
Whereas Realpolitik refers to political practice, the concept of political realism in international relations refers to a theoretical framework aimed at offering explanations for events in the international relations domain. The theory of political realism proceeds from the assumption that states—as actors in the international arena—pursue their interests by practicing Realpolitik. Conversely, Realpolitik can be described as the exercise of policies that are in line with accepted theories of political realism. In either case, the working hypothesis is generally that policy is chiefly based on the pursuit, possession and application of power (see also power politics). However, some international relations realists, such as Kenneth Waltz, have viewed state policy in terms of the pursuit of survival or security, rather than the pursuit of power for its own sake.

History and branches 
See political realism for branches and antecedents more relevant to contemporary diplomacy and the particular modern, international relations paradigm.
 Sun Tzu, a Chinese military strategist who wrote The Art of War that foreshadowed elements of Realpolitik developed later.
 Thucydides, a Greek historian who wrote the History of the Peloponnesian War and is also cited as an intellectual forebearer of Realpolitik.
 Chanakya (or Kautilya), an early Indian statesman and writer on the Arthashastra.
 Ibn Khaldun, an Arab historiographer, historian and one of the founding fathers of modern historiography, author of Muqaddimah, a universal history of time.
 Han Fei, a Chinese scholar who theorised Legalism (or Legism) and who served in the court of the King of Qin—later unifier of China ending the Warring States period. His theory centres on the Two Handles (about penalty and rewards as tools of governance). He theorised about a neutral, manipulative ruler who would act as head of state while secretly controlling the executive through his ministers—the ones to take real responsibility for any policy.
 Niccolò Machiavelli, an Italian political philosopher who wrote Il Principe (The Prince) in which he held that the sole aim of a prince (politician) was to seek power, regardless of religious or ethical considerations. However, there is scholarly debate about the nature and morality of his advice.
 Cardinal Richelieu, a French statesman who destroyed domestic factionalism and guided France to a position of dominance in foreign affairs.
 Thomas Hobbes, an English philosopher who wrote Leviathan in which he stated the state of nature was prone to a "war of all against all".
 Frederick the Great, a Prussian monarch who transformed Prussia into a great European power through warfare and diplomacy.
 Charles Maurice de Talleyrand-Périgord, a French diplomat who guided France and Europe through a variety of political systems.
 Prince Klemens Wenzel von Metternich, a Koblenz-born Austrian statesman opposed to political revolution.
 Carl von Clausewitz, an 18–19th century Prussian general and military strategist who wrote On War (Vom Kriege).
 Camillo Benso of Cavour, an Italian statesman who diplomatically managed to maneuver the Kingdom of Sardinia to become a new great power in Europe, controlling a nearly united Italy that was five times as large as the Kingdom of Sardinia had been before he came to power.
 Otto von Bismarck, a Prussian statesman who coined the term balance of power. Balancing power means keeping the peace and careful Realpolitik practitioners try to avoid arms races.
 20th century proponents of political realism include Hans Morgenthau, Henry Kissinger, George F. Kennan as well as politicians such as Charles de Gaulle and Lee Kuan Yew.
 Mao Zedong's Three Worlds Theory is described as Realpolitik by his critics, including Enver Hoxha, who argue that it was not based on a strong ideological grounding and used only to justify rapport with the West.

China 

Even prior to the contemporary Realpolitik term, China has had a "realistic" tradition in its governance dating back thousands of years. Often referred to as Chinese Legalism, the spirit of its content may be most readily recognized by Western viewers through one of its kindred, The Art of War. Chinese administrative organization significantly influenced other Asian nations as well as Western administrative practices not later than the 12th century, playing a significant role in the development of the modern state, including the usage of examinations for entry to the civil service.

Starting in the Spring and Autumn period (771–476/403 BC), a trend of "realistic" reformers were taken on to advance the material interest of their respective states, with the Qin state founding the first Chinese Empire, Qin dynasty in 221 BCE, ending China's Warring States period. The political theory developed during the era, including that of Confucianism would influence every dynasty thereafter.

Those termed Legalist are more purely "Realpolitikal" in contrast to Confucianism and include non-legal Shen Pu-hai derived political technique, which charges the ruler engage in passive observation to determine facts rather than take on too much himself. Sinologist Herrlee G. Creel writes: "If one wishes to exaggerate, it would no doubt be possible to translate (foundational Realist) Shen Buhai's term Shu, or technique, as 'science', and argue that Pu-hai was the first political scientist," though Creel does "not care to go this far".

During the Spring and Autumn period, the prevalent philosophy had dictated war as a gentleman's activity; military commanders were instructed to respect what they perceived to be Heaven's laws in battle. For example, when Duke Xiang of Song was at war with the state of Chu during the Warring States period, he declined an opportunity to attack the enemy force (commanded by Zhu) while they were crossing a river.

The Qin disregarded this military tradition, taking advantage of their enemy's weaknesses.

Germany 

In the United States, the term is often analogous to power politics while in Germany Realpolitik has a somewhat less negative connotation, referring to realistic politics in opposition to idealistic (or unrealistic) politics. It is particularly associated with the era of 19th century nationalism. Realpolitik policies were employed in response to the failed revolutions of 1848 as means to strengthen states and tighten social order.

The most famous German advocate of Realpolitik, what was uniquely possible and the applied means to achieve it, was Otto von Bismarck, the first Chancellor (1862–1890) to Wilhelm I of the Kingdom of Prussia. Bismarck used Realpolitik in his quest to achieve Prussian dominance in Germany. He manipulated political issues such as the Schleswig-Holstein Question and the Hohenzollern candidature to antagonize other countries and cause wars if necessary to attain his goals. Such policies are characteristic of Bismarck, demonstrating a pragmatic view of the "real" political world.

Another example was his willingness to adopt some social policies of the socialists such as employee insurance and pensions; in doing so, he used small changes from the top down to avoid the possibility of major change from the bottom up. Likewise, Prussia's seemingly illogical move of not demanding territory from a defeated Austria, a move that later led to the unification of Germany, is an oft-cited example of Realpolitik.

Singapore 

Singaporean statesman Lee Kuan Yew, who served as the country's first prime minister, has been considered by many political analysts as a pragmatist for his erudite policies in his governance of Singapore. He believed that the only way Singapore could survive as a relatively small nation as compared to its neighbours was to contrast itself from them, by building up a highly effective and non-corrupt government, in addition to a civil service, under a meritocratic system. He also believed that Singapore was to stay neutral but also possess a strong military capability, believing that it serves as a guarantor of the country's independence due to its strategic position. A strong advocate for Asian values, he argued that Asian societies had different values from Western societies and that practicing such values was vital to succeed as a nation, especially as an Asian country, which includes collectivism and communitarianism.

Lee described Singapore's only natural resources as being the grit of its people as well as their strong work ethic, propelling this mindset to all ethnic groups of the country. Although Lee supported left-wing ideas in his young adulthood, he was largely conservative as a leader, concluding that extensive state welfare and subsidies blunted the individual's drive to succeed. Nevertheless, his government still enacted social policies, which included free public education up until at least secondary school, state housing, a compulsory comprehensive savings and pension plan, as well as universal healthcare, in addition to a civic nationalist stance.

In 1975, Chan Heng Chee described Singapore as a depoliticized "administrative state", where ideology and politics had triumphantly been replaced by "rational and scientific modes of public administration". It is suggested that by doggedly describing itself as pragmatic, the Singaporean state is actually disguising its ideological work and political nature through an assertion of the absence of ideology and politics. Chua Beng Huat argued in 1995 that the rhetoric of pragmatism in Singapore is ideological and hegemonic in nature, adopted and disseminated in the public sphere by the People's Action Party government and institutionalized throughout the state in all its administrative, planning and policy-making functions.

Many world leaders affirmed Lee's political knowledge as being pragmatist and "insightful". Former President of the United States, Barack Obama, stated that he "personally appreciated [Lee's] wisdom." Former Prime Minister of Japan, Shinzo Abe, who had also championed for Asian values, stated that Lee was "one of the greatest leaders of modern times that Asia has ever produced" and a "great Asian leader who laid the foundation for the prosperity of Singapore today." Former Prime Minister of Australia, Tony Abbott, mentioned that Lee was a "giant of our region" and that "thanks to his vision and determination, Singapore is one of the world's most successful countries." Henry Kissinger described Lee as one of the "world's most successful pragmatists". Today, his ideologies and views are now taught at the Lee Kuan Yew School of Public Policy, an autonomous postgraduate school of the National University of Singapore.

United Kingdom 
E. H. Carr was a liberal realist and left-wing British historian and international relations theorist who argued for realistic international over utopian policies. Carr described realism as the acceptance that what exists is right; he thus argued that in politics, realism meant that there is no moral dimension and that what is successful is right and what is unsuccessful is wrong. Carr was convinced that the Bolsheviks were destined to win the Russian Civil War and, under the grounds of Realpolitik, approved of British Prime Minister David Lloyd George's opposition to War Secretary Winston Churchill's support for military help to the anti-Bolshevik White movement. In Carr's opinion, Churchill's support of the anti-Bolsheviks was folly, as Russia was likely to be a great power once more under the leadership of the Bolsheviks.

United States 

American Realpolitik began in the 1960s with the influence of Polish-American Zbigniew Brzezinski, later National Security Adviser to Jimmy Carter. Contrary to McCarthy-era hostility and John Foster Dulles's talk of the military "liberation" of the Eastern Bloc, Brzezinski proposed "peaceful engagement" with the Soviet Union while he advised Presidents John F. Kennedy and Lyndon B. Johnson. Brzezinski, uninterested in promoting anti-Soviet propaganda for the benefit of the United States, felt the United States would be more successful through frequent interactions with regimes and people under communist rule. Brzezinski knew the tough economic realities of those living in the Eastern Bloc, particularly the permanent shortage of goods, and that their attachment to the Soviet Union was born of historic necessity, rather than common ideology. Brzezinski suggested enticing these countries economically and through educational and cultural exchanges, which would appeal to intellectuals, followed by favoritism for regimes showing signs of liberalization or less reliance on Moscow. Through that approach, Brzezinski "offered a realistic, evolutionary alternative to empty political rhetoric."

Henry Kissinger has been credited with formally introducing the policy of Realpolitik to the White House as Secretary of State to Richard Nixon. In that context, the policy meant dealing with other powerful nations in a practical manner, rather than on the basis of political doctrine or ethics such as Nixon's diplomacy with the People's Republic of China despite American opposition to communism and the previous doctrine of containment. Another example is Kissinger's use of shuttle diplomacy after the 1973 Arab-Israeli war, when he persuaded the Israelis to withdraw partially from the Sinai in deference to the political realities created by the oil crisis.

Kissinger himself said that he had never used the term Realpolitik and stated that it is used by both liberal and realist foreign policy thinkers to label, criticize and facilitate a choosing of sides. Kissinger had looked at what he implemented while he served as Secretary of State and National Security Advisor not in the confines of making Realpolitik a standard policy, but within the terms of being a statesman. That political mindset can be seen in Kissinger's book A World Restored and was pointed out by historian John Bew in his book Realpolitik. Kissinger went on to say that the role of the statesman is "the ability to recognize the real relationship of forces and to make this knowledge serve his ends."

In that context, one can see how Realpolitik principles can influence American policy but not as standard policy. The reach and influence of Realpolitik is found instead in pragmatic and flexible policy that changes to the needs of the situation. That type of policymaking could be seen as recently as in the administration of Barack Obama. Bew made note of that direction in the Obama administration, when Obama's chief of staff, Rahm Emanuel, remarked in an article in The New York Times that everyone wanted to break it down into contrasts of idealist and realist, but "if you had to put him in a category, he's probably more realpolitik, like Bush 41 [...] You’ve got to be cold-blooded about the self-interests of your nation."

Realpolitik is distinct from ideological politics in that it is not dictated by a fixed set of rules but instead tends to be goal-oriented, limited only by practical exigencies. Since Realpolitik is ordered toward the most practical means of securing national interests, it can often entail compromising on ideological principles. For example, during the Cold War, the United States often supported authoritarian regimes that were human rights violators to secure theoretically the greater national interest of regional stability. After the end of the Cold War, this practice continued.

Most recently, former Ambassador Dennis Ross advocated that approach to foreign policy in his 2007 book Statecraft: And How to Restore America's Standing in the World. For the purposes of contrast and speaking in ideal types, political ideologues would tend to favor principle over other considerations. Such individuals or groups can reject compromises that they see as the abandonment of their ideals and so may sacrifice political gain, in favor of adhering to principles that they believe to be constitutive of long-term goals.

See also 

 Consequentialism
 Machtpolitik
 Monopoly on the legitimate use of physical force
 Netpolitik
 Noopolitik
 Tonyukuk
 Weltpolitik

Notes

References

Works cited 
 John Bew: "The Real Origins of Realpolitik", The National Interest, 2014
 John Bew: "Real Realpolitik: A History", The John W. Kluge Center at the Library of Congress, April 10, 2014. Accessed July 29, 2014.
 David Robertson: The Routledge Dictionary of Politics. Routledge 2004. , p. 420
 Hajo Holborn: History of Modern Germany: 1840–1945. Princeton University Press 1982, p. 117
 Ruth Weissbourd Grant: Hypocrisy and integrity: Machiavelli, Rousseau, and the ethics of politics. University of Chicago Press 1997, p. 40–41
 Frank Whelon Wayman (ed.), Paul Francis Diehl (ed.): Reconstructing Realpolitik. University of Michigan Press 1994, 
 Federico Trocini: L’invenzione della «Realpolitik» e la scoperta della «legge del potere». August Ludwig von Rochau tra radicalismo e nazional-liberalismo, il Mulino, Bologna 2009

International relations
Political realism
German words and phrases
Foreign policy doctrines